The Minister-in-Charge of Muslim Affairs is an appointment in the Cabinet of Singapore that oversees policies and issues related to the Muslim community in Singapore. The minister-in-charge of Muslim affairs also oversee the Administration of Muslim Law Act (AMLA). The incumbent minister is Masagos Zulkifli.

Ahmad Mattar was appointed as the first Minister-in-Charge of Muslim Affairs in 1977.

Before this position was created, then-Minister for Social Affairs and Sports, Othman Wok and then-Senior Minister of State for Foreign Affairs, A. Rahim Ishak were put in charge of the administration of Muslim affairs in the country.

List of ministers-in-charge

References

Islam in Singapore
Muslim Affairs